Glory of the Morning (died c. 1832) was the first woman ever described in the written history of Wisconsin, and the only known female chief of the Hocąk (Winnebago) nation. At least one source has rendered her name as Hopokoekau, which is a corruption of Hąboguwįga, from hąp, "day"; ho-, "the time at which"; gu, "to come arriving"; -wį, an affix indicating the feminine gender; and -ga, a definite article used for personal names. The name is conventionally translated as "Glory of the Morning" or "The Coming Dawn".

She was the daughter of the chief of the tribe, and therefore a member of the Thunderbird Clan who lived in a large village on Doty Island in what is now Menasha, Winnebago County, Wisconsin. Sometime before 1730, the French—in connection with their development of the vast territory of Louisiana—renewed contact with the tribe. A small force of French troops under the command of Sabrevoir de Carrie visited the Hocągara and established cordial relations. The opportunities of this contact impressed themselves upon Carrie, who resigned his commission to become a fur trader among the tribe. It was around this time that he married Glory of the Morning. It cannot be established whether she was made chief before or after this marriage. Her marriage seems to have enhanced her status, as Carrie is remembered very favorably in the Hocąk oral tradition, which says, "in his affairs he was most emphatically a leader of men." Glory of the Morning bore him two sons and a daughter.  The eldest son was Cugiga, "Spoon, Ladle", known to history as "Spoon Dekaury". The younger son was known as Cap’osgaga, "White Breast", also called "Buzzard Decorah". In time the marriage dissolved, and Sabrevoir de Carrie returned to his residence in Quebec, taking his little daughter with him. When she grew up, she married Laurent Fily, an Indian trader in Quebec. When the French and Indian War broke out, Carrie received a new commission in the French army, and on April 28, 1760, during the Battle of Sainte-Foy he was mortally wounded and later died in the hospital in Montreal.

As the French struggled with the Fox people over the fur trade, Glory of the Morning firmly allied herself with her husband's people, precipitating seven years of war with their neighbors. In the end, she was instrumental in bringing peace. Later she allowed renewed warfare against the Illini, her braves falling upon the Michigamea and the Cahokia. When war between France and Great Britain broke out in 1754, the Hocak warriors attacked the English settlements far to the east. However, when the British overcame the French, Glory of the Morning established friendly relations with them and refused to tread the war path of Pontiac. Three years later Capt. Jonathan Carver, a Connecticut Yankee in the service of the Crown, paid a visit to her village in 1766, and he gives an interesting account of her.

 On the 25th [of September] I left the Green Bay, and proceeded up Fox River, still in company with the traders and some Indians. On the 25th I arrived at the great town of the Winnebagoes, situated on a small island just as you enter the east end of Lake Winnebago. Here the queen who presided over this tribe instead of a Sachem, received me with great civility, and entertained me in a very distinguished manner, during the four days I continued with her.

The day after my arrival I held a council with the chiefs, of whom I asked permission to pass through their country, in my way to more remote nations on business of importance. This was readily granted me, the request being esteemed by them as a great compliment paid to their tribe. The Queen sat in (33) the council, but only asked a few questions, or gave some trifling directions in matters relative to the state; for women are never allowed to sit in their councils, except they happen to be invested with the supreme authority, and then it is not customary for them to make any formal speeches as the chiefs do. She was a very ancient woman, small in stature, and not much distinguished by her dress from several young women that attended her. These her attendants seemed greatly pleased whenever I showed any tokens of respect to their queen, particularly when I saluted her, which I frequently did to acquire her favour. On these occasions the good old lady endeavoured to assume a juvenile gaiety, and by her smiles showed she was equally pleased with the attention I paid her. ...

Having made some acceptable presents to the good old queen, and received her blessing, I left the town of the Winnebagoes on the 29th of September ...

Nothing more is heard of her until the Kinzies visited her in 1832. She had lived to an unheard of age. Mrs. Kinzie paints a portrait of her:

There was among their number, this year, one whom I had never before seen—the mother of the elder Day-kau-ray. No one could tell her age, but all agreed that she must have seen upwards of a hundred winters. Her eyes dimmed, and almost white with age—her face dark and withered, like a baked apple—her voice tremulous and feeble, except when raised in fury to reprove her graceless grandsons, who were fond of playing her all sorts of mischievous tricks, indicated the very great age she must have attained. She usually went upon all fours, not having strength to hold herself erect. On the day of the payment, having received her portion, which she carefully hid in the corner of her blanket, she came crawling along and seated herself on the door step, to count her treasure.... In spite of their vexatious tricks, she seemed very fond of them, and never failed to beg something of her Father, that she might bestow upon them.

She crept into the parlor one morning, then straightening herself up, and supporting herself by the frame of the door, she cried in a most piteous tone,—"Shaw-nee-aw-kee Wau-tshob-ee-rah Thsoonsh-koo-nee-noh!" [Žuniya-ąké ho(kik)čąbira čųšgunįno] (Silver-man I have no looking glass.) My husband smiling and taking up the same little tone, cried, in return,— "Do you wish to look at yourself mother?" The idea seemed to her so irresistibly comic that she laughed until she was fairly obliged to seat herself upon the floor and give way to her enjoyment. She then owned that it was for one of the boys that she wanted the little mirror. When her Father had given it to her, she found that she had "no comb," then that she had "no knife," then that she had "no calico shawl," until it ended, as it generally did, by Shaw-nee-aw-kee paying pretty dearly for his joke. 

She must have died soon afterwards. Hocąk lore has filled in the details. The tradition says that when she was out among the pines, an owl, a creature of ill omen, perched nearby and uttered her name. That night, wrapped in her furs with a smile on her face, she died. Strangely, during the raging blizzard that engulfed the village that night, the rare sound of thunder could be heard, as the patron deities of her clan called her home.

Her offspring flourished as the famed Decorah family, who supplied countless chiefs to the nation. Her grandson was Chief Waukon Decorah, the eponym of two cities in Iowa, Waukon and Decorah.

Notes

External links
Ho-poe-kaw (Glory of the Morning) | Wisconsin Historical Society

People of pre-statehood Wisconsin
Ho-Chunk people
Female Native American leaders
19th-century women rulers
1830s deaths
19th-century Native American women
19th-century Native Americans
18th-century women rulers
18th-century Native American women
18th-century Native Americans